A Place to Live may refer to:
 A Place to Live (1941 film)
 A Place to Live (2018 film)